The Killam Wheat Kings are a junior "B" ice hockey team based in Killam, Alberta, Canada. They are members of the North Eastern Alberta Junior B Hockey League (NEAJBHL). They play their home games at Killam Agriplex.

History
In 2012, the Killam Wheat Kings were selected to be the host of the Russ Barnes Trophy Championships.  As host they were guaranteed a spot in the Provincial Championships and an opportunity to earn their way to the Keystone Cup to battle for the Western Canada Junior B Championships.

Season-by-season record

Note: GP = Games played, W = Wins, L = Losses, OTL = Overtime Losses, Pts = Points, GF = Goals for, GA = Goals against, PIM = Penalties in minutes

Russ Barnes Trophy
Alberta Jr. B Provincial Championships

* — Heritage League had two representatives with Red Deer being host, NEAJBL given second team.

NHL alumni
Shane Doan
Kyle Freadrich
 Bill Peters

Awards and trophies
Top Scorer
Shayne Andres: 2010–11

See also
List of ice hockey teams in Alberta

External links
Official website of the Killam Wheat Kings

Ice hockey teams in Alberta